Dan Eldad is an Israeli lawyer who served as acting State Attorney of Israel from 5 February to 1 May 2020.

Life
Eldad is the son of the Israeli actress Dina Doron and theater director Ilan Eldad. He was appointed to head the economic investigations department in the State Attorney's office in 2013; in this post he prosecuted high-profile corruption cases.

The previous State Attorney was Shai Nitzan, whose term expired in December 2019. The position was vacant until 5 February 2020, because Attorney General Avichai Mandelblit had initially objected to Justice Minister Amir Ohana's first choice and also objected to Eldad (Ohana's second choice) before dropping his opposition. Eldad's appointment was for a temporary three-month term and expires on 1 May 2020. In April, Mandelblit expressed his opposition to the lengthening of Eldad's term, writing in a letter to Civil Service Commissioner Daniel Hershkowitz that Eldad had exhibited "moral, professional and administrative failings" during his time in office. Mandelblit reportedly believes that Eldad and Ohana are trying to oust him. On 30 April, the High Court ruled that Eldad's term would not be extended, and it is not clear who will replace him.

References

Living people
State Attorneys of Israel
Year of birth missing (living people)